Current HIV/AIDS Reports is a quarterly peer-reviewed medical review journal covering HIV/AIDS. It was established in 2004 and is published by Springer Science+Business Media. The editor-in-chief is Paul Volberding (University of California, San Francisco). According to the Journal Citation Reports, the journal has a 2018 impact factor of 4.382.

References

External links

HIV/AIDS journals
Review journals
Quarterly journals
Publications established in 2004
Springer Science+Business Media academic journals
English-language journals